Marshall County School District, Marshall County School System, or Marshall County Schools may refer to:
Marshall County School District (Alabama)
Marshall County School District (Kentucky)
Marshall County School District (Mississippi)
Marshall County School District (Tennessee)
Marshall County Schools (West Virginia)